Whitfield Moseley (born 6 April 1940) is a Nigerian boxer. He competed in the men's welterweight event at the 1960 Summer Olympics.

References

1940 births
Living people
Nigerian male boxers
Olympic boxers of Nigeria
Boxers at the 1960 Summer Olympics
Sportspeople from Freetown
Welterweight boxers